Juan Antonio Ragué (27 July 1928 – 12 May 2007) was a Spanish sailor. He competed in the 5.5 Metre event at the 1960 Summer Olympics.

References

External links
 

1928 births
2007 deaths
Spanish male sailors (sport)
Olympic sailors of Spain
Sailors at the 1960 Summer Olympics – 5.5 Metre
Sportspeople from Barcelona